ŠK Plavecký Štvrtok OFK Vysoká is a Slovak football team, based in the town of Plavecký Štvrtok. The club was founded in 1930.

References

External links 
at futbalvregione.sk 

Plavecky Stvrtok
Sport in Bratislava Region
Association football clubs established in 1930
1930 establishments in Slovakia